Cotton University (formerly known as Cotton College) is a public state university located in Guwahati, Assam, India. It was established in 2017 by the provisions of an Act from the Assam Legislative Assembly which merged Cotton College State University and Cotton College. The University has progressed to become one of the top 200 institutions of the country (appearing on the list of 150–200 in the National Institutional Ranking Framework rank list in May 2020).

Cotton College was established in 1901 by Sir Henry Stedman Cotton, Chief Commissioner of the former British province of Assam. It was the oldest institute of higher education in Assam and all of Northeast India. Cotton College became a constituent college of Gauhati University in 1948, and then of Cotton College State University when it was established in 2011, by an Act (Act XIX of 2011) of the Assam Government. The Cotton University Act, 2017, was enacted to resolve problems between the college and the university.

History 

In 1899 Manick Chandra wrote to the British government asking to open a college in Guwahati, insofar as Assam was the only province with no college and that Guwahati was the most convenient location. In response, Sir Henry Stedman Cotton, K.C.S.I., then the Chief Commissioner of Assam, announced on 3 November 1899 that a college would be opened in Guwahati. Cotton College, named by the public, was inaugurated on 27 May 1901 by Cotton himself. It was affiliated with Calcutta University and began with five professors which included Frederick William Sudmerson, the first principal of the college, and 39 students.

The college was the centre of the freedom movement as well as literary and cultural movements of the state, which aimed to build Assam's identity as a distinct, integral component of India. When Gauhati University was established in 1948, Cotton College became affiliated with it as a constituent college. In 2015, the college was declared a Special Heritage College.

On 16 October 1992, the college was named as a center of excellence, an occasion celebrated in a solemn ceremony with Shankar Dayal Sharma,  then President of India, and it officially became a post-graduate college.

Cotton College celebrated its centennial with a year-long program from 27 May 2001 to 26 May 2002. Krishan Kant, then Vice President of India graced the closing ceremony. India Post issued a ₹4.00 commemorative postage stamp on 25 May 2002 as part of the centenary celebration.

Cotton College State University

Cotton College State University was created through an Act of the Government of Assam (Act XIX of 2011). This act received the assent of the Governor of Assam on 3 September 2011, published in the Assam Gazette on 5 September 2011. The Cotton College became its constituent college.

The election for the University's first Academic Council and University Court was held on 22 February 2013 with three and five members elected respectively.

Cotton University

Over time, conflicts emerged between the University and the College chiefly over the custody of properties. The Assam Legislative Assembly passed an amendment in 2015 that the university and the college be run as separate institutes. The bill, called The Cotton University Act 2017, was passed by the Assam Legislative Assembly on 2 March 2017 in order to resolve these problems. By this act, the University and College would be completely merged. Upon enforcement, the university was renamed Cotton University. By ordinance, the Governor of Assam, Banwarilal Purohit became Chancellor, who then appointed Bhabesh Chandra Goswami as the first Vice Chancellor in July 2017.

Organisation and administration

Faculties and Centres
 Faculty of Languages, Literature and Linguistics
 Faculty of  Physical,  Chemical and Mathematical Sciences
 Faculty of Humanities and Social Sciences
 Faculty of Earth Sciences
 Faculty of Life Sciences
 Centre for Women's Studies

Rankings

Academics

Academic programmes

HSSLC
In keeping with the former Cotton College's traditions, courses leading to Higher Secondary School Leaving Certificate are possible in the Arts and Science streams. This qualification is awarded upon successful completion of two years of study followed by relevant examinations under the Assam Higher Secondary Educational Council.

Bachelors degrees
Bachelor of Arts, Bachelor of Science, Bachelor of Computer Application, Bachelor of Liberal Arts, Bachelor of Mass Communication and Journalism and Bachelor of Science (Hons) Biotechnology graduate degrees are offered. The degrees are awarded upon successful completion of three years of study followed by relevant examinations under Cotton University.

Masters degrees
Postgraduate programs leading to the degrees of Master of Arts, Master of Science, Master of Library and Information Science, Master of Law, Master in Computer Application and Master of Science in Artificial Intelligence and Machine Learning are offered. The degrees are awarded upon successful completion of two years of study followed by relevant examinations under Cotton University. Admission is offered by way of a national-level entrance examination.

Doctoral programme 
The degree of Doctor of Philosophy (Ph.D.) is offered in all postgraduate departments. Admission opens annually in June/July. Selection is based on a written test and a viva voce oral examination. UGC/CSIR JRF/NET/SET qualified candidates are exempted from written tests.

Accreditation

This institution was accredited with a cumulative grade point average of 3.76 on a four-point scale and grade A++ on 5 November 2016 by the 18th SC executive committee of the National Assessment and Accreditation Council. At the time, the cumulative grade point average score was the third-highest among colleges in India.

Student life

Hostels
 Krishna Kanta Handique Post Graduate Boys' Hostel (established in 1901; capacity 75 students in 22 rooms)
 Swahid Muzammil Haque Boys' Hostel (established in 1902; capacity 64 students in 20 rooms)
 Rajanikanta Bordoloi Boys' Hostel (established in 1910; capacity 85 students in 30 rooms)
 Swahid Ranjit Barpujari Boys' Hostel (established in 1913; capacity 93 students in 33 rooms)
 Anundo Ram Barooah Boys' Hostel (established in 1913; capacity 99 students in 33 rooms)
 Seetanath Brahma Chaudhury Boys' Hostel (established in 1929; capacity 90 students in 25 rooms)
 Mahendra Nath Deka Phukan Boys' Hostel (established in 1955; capacity 110 students in 28 rooms)
 Padmashree Nalini Bala Devi Girls' Hostel (established in 1950; capacity 112 students in 25 rooms)
 Swahid Kanaklata Girls' Hostel (established in 1971; capacity 105 students in 21 rooms)
 Dr. Kamala Roy Girls' Hostel (established in 2001; capacity 60 students in 25 rooms)

Notable alumni and faculty

Noted alumni

Amulya Barua, Assamese poet
Nayandeep Deka Baruah, Indian mathematician and professor
Bhupen Hazarika, Bharat Ratna, Famous playback singer
Birendra Kumar Bhattacharya, Indian writer
Surya Kumar Bhuyan, former president of Asom Sahitya Sabha
Kopil Bora, Assamese actor
Gopinath Bordoloi, Bharat Ratna, Former Chief Minister of Assam
Homen Borgohain, Indian writer
Nirupama Borgohain, Indian journalist
Parineeta Borthakur, Assamese actor
Upendranath Brahma, former president of the All Bodo Students' Union.
Ambika Charan Choudhury, Indian litterateur, historian and activist
Moinul Hoque Choudhury, Indian politician
Rita Chowdhury, Indian writer
Ardhendu Kumar Dey, Indian politician
Lalit Kumar Doley, Indian politician
Akhil Gogoi, Peasant leader and MLA, Sibsagar, Assam
Ranjan Gogoi, 46th Chief Justice of India
Bhupendra Nath Goswami, Indian meteorologist
Indira Goswami, Indian writer
Jitendra Nath Goswami, Indian scientist
Parbati Kumar Goswami, Judge of India
Krishna Kanta Handique, Sanskrit scholar
Satish Chandra Kakati, ex-editor of The Assam Tribune
Gauri Shankar Kalita, Journalist
Kamalendu Deb Krori, Indian physicist
Motiur Rohman Mondal, Indian politician and physician
Arupa Kalita Patangia, Indian Novelist
Kalpana Patowary, playback and folk singer (Bhojpuri and others)
Anuradha Sharma Pujari, Assamese journalist and author
Debapratim Purkayastha, Indian academic
Jyoti Prasad Rajkhowa, former governor of Arunachal Pradesh
Muhammed Saadulah, Prime Minister of Assam Province
Anupam Saikia, Indian mathematician.
Bhabendra Nath Saikia, Indian film director, famous writer
Hiteswar Saikia, former Chief Minister of Assam
Himanta Biswa Sarma, Chief Minister Of Assam
Sarat Chandra Sinha, former Chief Minister of Assam
Sonaram Sutiya, scholar, freedom fighter and educationist
Jerifa Wahid, Actor
Arup Jyoti Das, Athor

Noted faculty
 Abu Nasr Waheed, educationist, was a professor of Arabic and Persian at Cotton College.

List of principals
The institute had 50 principals from 1901 till 2012.

References 

 
Universities in Assam
Universities and colleges in Guwahati
1901 establishments in India
Academic institutions associated with the Bengal Renaissance
Educational institutions established in 1901
State universities in India